Casarza Ligure is a comune (municipality) in the Metropolitan City of Genoa in the Italian region Liguria, located about  southeast of Genoa.

Casarza Ligure borders the following municipalities: Castiglione Chiavarese, Maissana, Moneglia, Ne, Sestri Levante.

References

External links
 Official website

Cities and towns in Liguria